Marena is a village and principal settlement (chef-lieu) of the commune of Tringa in the Cercle of Yélimané in the Kayes Region of south-western Mali.

References

Populated places in Kayes Region